Melothria pendula, also known as the creeping cucumber or the Guadeloupe cucumber, is a plant in the Benincaseae tribe. The plant is especially prominent in southeast regions of the United States. The plant resembles the cultivated cucumber, possessing miniature yellow flowers, similar leaf shape, same leaf patterns, as well as similar growth patterns. The unripe berries strongly resemble minuscule watermelons.

Etymology
The genus name  is from Ancient Greek μηλοθρων : mēlothrōn 'kind of white grape' in reference to small grapevine fruits born by the genus. The specific name  means 'hanging'.

Toxicity
The ripe berries, which are black, have powerful laxative qualities when consumed. The root, vines, leaves, and flowers have unknown toxicity.

Edibility
The berries, when unripe and light green can be eaten raw. Dogs are known to eat the leaves without any apparent side effects.

Ecology
The larvae of Hypercompe cunigunda have been recorded feeding on this plant.

References

Cucurbitoideae
Edible plants